Maria Martina "Ria" van Velsen (born 22 March 1943 in The Hague) is a retired Dutch backstroke swimmer who participated in the 1960 and 1964 Summer Olympics. In 1960, she was sevenths individually in the 100m backstroke event. She was also part of the Dutch medley team that broke the 4 × 100 m medley Olympic record in the preliminaries; however, they finished fourth in the final. She also won two medals at the 1962 European Aquatics Championships, and set four world records: three in 100m backstroke (1958, 1959, 1960) and one in the 4 × 100 m medley relay (1964).

References

1943 births
Living people
Dutch female backstroke swimmers
Olympic swimmers of the Netherlands
Swimmers at the 1960 Summer Olympics
Swimmers at the 1964 Summer Olympics
Swimmers from The Hague
European Aquatics Championships medalists in swimming